Keio University (慶應義塾) is the oldest and most highly rated private university in Japan. Due to its age, its campuses have many historic buildings. This article introduces some of the school's notable architecture.

Mita campus

Ten years later the school's name changed to Keio Gijyuku (慶應義塾); in 1871 it moved to Mita, its main campus. The campus has a number of historic structures.

 Maboroshi no mon
The former main gate, the original black wooden gate dated to the Edo period. The present stone gate was built in 1913. In 2000, the gate was moved to top of a sloping stone walkway.

 
 The original building was constructed in 1876. In 1947 the tile-roofed, two-story, Western-style wooden building was restored, and in 1967 it was designated an important cultural property.

Inari yama
Inari yama is atop a flight of stone steps near the Speech Hall. Although the shrine is gone, its name persisted after the university's founding.

The old library and the Speech Hall are iconic campus buildings. The library was completed in 1912 as part of the university's 50th-anniversary celebrations. Designed by Sone Tatsuzō with his architectural partner Chujo Siichiro. It includes the Fukuzawa Memorial Center of modern Japanese studies and the Institute of Oriental Classics (Shido Bunko).

 
 The campus administration building is known as Jyukukan-kyoku. Completed in 1926, it replaced a two-story brick building dating to 1886. Jyukukan-kyoku houses a number of departments, offices and meeting rooms.

 
 Built in 2011, the new Minami kōsha was part of the university's 150th-anniversary celebration. Its design is similar in its modernism to the old Minami kōsha. The building has a mixture of lecture, study and multipurpose rooms.

 
 The old school building was constructed for the university's centenary in 1959. The 36-room building, with a capacity of 2,721, was the largest building on the Mita campus for many years.

 
 Built in 2000, the East Research Building was designed like an old brick library. Near Maboroshi no mon, its arch features a quotation by Fukuzawa Yukichi in Latin: Homo nec ullas cuiquam praepositus nec subditus creatur ("Heaven does not make one man better or worse than others"). The  is named for American writer and medical doctor Michael Crichton.

 
 The South Annex was built in 2009 to provide lecture space during the construction of the south building. The annex is headquarters for research coordination and administration, a research and administration center for the arts and a training room for the graduate school of human relations and the Institute of Cultural and Linguistic Studies.

 
 Designed by Fumihiko Maki, the new library was completed in 1982. The building has six stories above ground and five underground. Maki won the 1982 BCS prize for his design.

 
 Built by Taisei Kensetsu in 2005, the seismically-isolated, reinforced-concrete South Building has eleven stories above ground and five underground. The building has classrooms, offices and training and counseling rooms.

 New Banraisha
 Banraisha is a social club for alumni, teachers and students. Designed by :ja:Yoshiro Taniguchi and Isamu Noguchi, it was begun in 1946 to replace an 1887 building destroyed by American B-29 bombers in 1944 during the Pacific War. The  was completed in 1951. In 2005, it (and its garden) was moved to the roof of the South Building.

 Graduate-school building
The graduate-school building was constructed as part of the university's 125th anniversary. It houses classrooms, research rooms and offices.

Other buildings include:
: Keio University Athletic Association and Mita Bungaku offices, internal audit services
: Conference hall, health center and offices
: Classrooms and offices
: Offices, meeting and research rooms
Keio University Press: International dormitory

Hiyoshi campus
The Hiyoshi campus opened in 1934. Soon after its relocation the navy constructed a dugout, which remains. The campus still contains some undeveloped areas. The tree-lined street received  in 1997.

Notable buildings include:

Building One: Keiō Gijyuku high school building

The complex features a pool, the graduate school and facilities available to the public.
Raiōsha (来往舎): Designed and constructed by Shimizu Group in 2001, the seven-story building contains laboratories and reference libraries.

Building Four (Independence Wing): Built in 2009 as part of the university's 150th-anniversary celebration by Kashima Group, the building features a communications studio.

Hiyoshi Library: Built with a ship motif in 1985, the library has 600,000 titles.

: Built for the university's 100th anniversary in 1958, the hall's restructuring plans have been postponed.

Fujiwara Memorial Hall: Built in 1958 as a library with a donation from Aiichirō Fujiwara, it is now a multipurpose building.
KBS: Opened in 1978, the former graduate school is vacant.
Building Three: Classrooms, foreign-language lounge
Building Four: Section A—classrooms; Section B—classrooms, counseling room, international and business centers
Building Five: Built in 1962, the four-story building was demolished and replaced by a garden.
Building Six: Classrooms, terrace
Building Seven: Classrooms, lecture room, Hiyoshi information-technology center, computer room
Building Eight: Classrooms, Psychology laboratory, art research room, musicology research department

Indoor fitness facilities
Gymnasium: Judo and Kendo training rooms
Sport ridge: Research laboratory, ping-pong training room
Judo training room
Sports medicine research center

Outdoor athletic plant
Rugby field (birthplace of Japanese rugby)
Equestrian facility

Public-health facility
Health-management center
Extracurricular-activity center
Commons: Restaurants, assembly room, store

Accommodations
: Designed by Yoshiro Taniguchi (1937)
: Four stories
Baseball-club hostel (2008)
KBS house
Keio Nestle House

Other facilities
Dugout entrance 
Yayoi period residence, with burial chamber

YMCA chapel (1936)

Shinanomachi campus
In 1917 a  opened in Mita, later moving to Shinanomachi and (during World War II) Musashino. Notable buildings include:
: Built in 1987, the 11-story hospital has 1,056 beds. 

 Kitasato Memorial Medical Library: In 1937, the  unveiled plans for a library in memory of the medical school's founder, Shibasaburo Kitazato. In 1944 the commission donated the building to the university, and in 2004 it was renamed the Shinanomachi Media Center. It has a large number of books, specializing in medical history. The  is awarded annually.

Institute of Integrated Medical Research: The nine-story building was constructed in 2001.

Clinical Research Building: The five-story building was constructed in February 2008.

Building 3: The six-story building has two wings: North (Clinical Research Building II) and South.

Clinic
Central wing (1963)
Wing 1 wards: Two outpatient wards (1965)
Wing 2 wards: Clinical research wing (department of internal medicine)
Wing 6 wards (1953)
Wing 7 wards (1954)
Outpatient rehabilitation center
Endocrine center
Advanced care center
Radiographic diagnostic center
Mortuary

Education and research
East lecture hall (1957)
Lecture Hall 2 (1961)
Education and Research Building (1996): Lecture hall and seminar room
Clinical Research Hall: Lecture theater
: Nursing-school lecture room, general-education center, gym
Museum
Animal housing 
Boiler room

Other buildings
: The Shinto shrine is located on campus.

Yagami campus

: Built in 2000, the building has a basement reference room.

Shonan Fujisawa campus

Shiba kyoritsu campus 
In 2008 Keio University joined  with campuses in Shiba and Urawa, opening its Department of Pharmacology and the Graduate School of Pharmaceutical Sciences. The campus has three buildings: 1, 2 and 3.

Shin-kawasaki campus
The K2Town campus, built in 2000, aims to advance research and development among industry, academia and Kawasaki.

Further reading
『慶應義塾七十五年史』 (1932) 
『慶應義塾百年史』 (1969) 
Jyunichiro Isida (石田潤一郎), Akihisa Masuda (増田彰久) (1980) 『日本の建築　明治大正昭和7 ブルジョワジーの装飾』（Sanseido） 
Keio Gijyuku University Mita information centor (慶應義塾大学三田情報センター編)　(1972) 『慶應義塾図書館史』（慶應義塾大学三田情報センター）  
『慶應義塾史事典』 (2008)

References

External links 

Keio gijyuku (written in Japanese)
Web site of Keio gijyuku 150th anniversary of the founding.

Keio University

ja:学校法人慶應義塾